This article documents the version history of the Linux kernel. The Linux kernel is a free and open-source, monolithic, Unix-like operating system kernel. It was conceived and created in 1991 by Linus Torvalds.

Linux kernels have different support levels depending on the version. Usually, each stable version continues to backport bug fixes from the mainline until the next stable version is released. However, if a stable version has been designated a long-term support (LTS) kernel, it will be maintained for extra few years. After that, a few versions got declared Super-Long-Term Support (SLTS) will then be maintained by the Civil Infrastructure Platform for many more years.

Releases up to 2.6.0

Releases 2.6.x.y
Versions 2.6.16 and 2.6.27 of the Linux kernel were unofficially supported in a long-term support (LTS) fashion, before a 2011 working group in the Linux Foundation started a formal long-term support initiative.

Releases 3.x.y
The jump from 2.6.x to 3.x wasn't because of a breaking update, but rather the first release of a new versioning scheme introduced as a more convenient system.

Releases 4.x.y

Releases 5.x.y

Releases 6.x.y

See also

 Linux adoption
 Linux kernel
 History of Linux
 Timeline of free and open-source software

References

External links
 Official Linux kernel website
 Active kernel releases, on the official Linux kernel website
 Linux versions changelog, in Linux Kernel Newbies
 Linux Kernel Version History: Consolidated list

Linux kernel
Software version histories